Garry Welch is a former football (soccer) player who had 165 national league appearances for Stop Out and Wellington Diamond United and also represented New Zealand at international level.

Welch played three official full internationals for New Zealand in February 1980, all against Pacific neighbours Fiji, drawing 1–1 in his debut match on 19 February before a 4–0 win and a 0–2 loss on 21 and 27 February 1980 respectively.

He is now a research scientist at the University of Connecticut.

References 

1955 births
Living people
Wellington United players
Stop Out players
New Zealand association footballers
New Zealand international footballers
Association football midfielders
1980 Oceania Cup players